André Flajolet is a French politician. He was born on 6 December 1946 in Saint-Floris, départment of Pas-de-Calais. He is a philosophy teacher.
He was elected on 16 June 2002 deputy of the 9th circonscription of Pas-de-Calais (Béthune and surroundings) for the 12th Legislature so as becoming the first right-wing deputy for many years.
He was re-elected on 17 June 2007 deputy of the 13th Legislature.
During his two mandates, he was  member of the Union for a Popular Movement parliamentary group.

External links

 official site

Living people
1946 births
Union for a Popular Movement politicians
Deputies of the 12th National Assembly of the French Fifth Republic
Deputies of the 13th National Assembly of the French Fifth Republic